Microlunatus antarcticus is an LL-diaminopimelic acid-containing actinomycete. It is gram-positive, aerobic and slowly growing.

References

Further reading
Whitman, William B., et al., eds. Bergey's manual® of systematic bacteriology. Vol. 5. Springer, 2012. 
Dworkin, Martin, and Stanley Falkow, eds. The Prokaryotes: Vol. 3: Archaea. Bacteria: Firmicutes, Actinomycetes. Vol. 3. Springer Verlag, 2006.

External links 
LPSN

Type strain of Friedmanniella antarctica at BacDive -  the Bacterial Diversity Metadatabase

Propionibacteriales
Bacteria described in 1997